Kapilavai Lingamurthy; born 31 March 1928) is a Telugu poet and writer from Mahabubnagar District of Telangana, India.

Early life and family

Kapilavai Lingamurthy was born on 31 March 1928 in Jinukunta, Mahabubnagar district of Telangana state (formerly Hyderabad state). His father Kapilavai Venkatachalam died when Lingamurthy was 3 years old. Following this, he moved to his maternal uncle's home. It was here he developed the interest in literature from his maternal uncle Chepooru Peddalakshmaiah from Amrabad near Achampet.

In 1944, he married Chinthapatla Meenakshamma, who was originally from Nagarkurnool.

Studies and career
Lingamurthy graduated from Osmania University-Hyderabad with a Master of Arts in Telugu literature. He was a teacher and lecturer by profession.

He joined as a teacher in Nagarkurnool national high school on 11 July 1954 and later trained in MOL (Master of Oriental Learning). He joined in Sri Venkateshwara Oriental College, Palem, as a history lecturer on 19 August 1972. He retired on 28 February 1983.

Literature
Lingamurthy is a prominent writer and researcher in Telugu, and his services continue to be in demand three decades after his retirement.

Lingamurthy is well-versed in both Telugu poetry and prose. He has written more than 100 books in the Telugu language. Among his books, the most popular are:
 Palamoor zilla Devalayalu (పాలమూరు జిల్లా దేవాలయాలు)
 Paamara Samskritam"" (పామర సంస్కృతం) 
 Saalagramashastram (సాలగ్రామ శాస్త్రం)
 Aarya shatakam (ఆర్యా శతకం)
 Maangalya shastram (మాంగళ్య శాస్త్రం)
 Sri Mathprathapagiri khandam (శ్రీ మత్ప్రతాపగిరి ఖండం)
 Someshwara Kshetra Mahatyam and Charitra (సోమేశ్వరక్షేత్ర మహత్యం, చరిత్ర)
 Sundaree Sandeshamu (సుందరీ సందేశం)
 Padya kathaa Parimalamu (పద్యకథా పరిమళము)
 Sri Rudraadhyaayamu (శ్రీ రుద్రాధ్యాయము) written with D.Chandrashekar reddy

Lingamurthy wrote Umamaheshwara Kshetram'', a history of the temple of Umamaheswaram, known as the northern gateway of a pilgrimage route to Srisailam.

Awards
Lingamurthy received an honorary doctorate from Telugu University-Hyderabad in August 2014.

Six scholars conducted their doctoral research on Lingamurthy's body of work.

Kapilavai Lingamurthy has created the following titles:

(translation in brackets)

 "Kavitha Kalanidhi" – 1992 – (Kavitha Kalanidhi)
 "Research Panachana" – 1992 - (Parishodhanaa Panchaanana)
 "కవి కేసరి" – 1996 – (Kavi Kesari)
 "వేదాంత విశారద" – 2005 – (Vedanta Vishaarada)
 "గురుశిరోమణి" – 2010 – (Guru Shiromani)
 "సాహిత్య స్వర్ణసౌరభ కేసరి" – 2012 – (Sahithya Swarnasourabha Kesari)
Apart from the titles mentioned above, he received the awards listed below:
 Pratibhaa Puraskaaram from Telugu University-Hyderabad
 Burgula Ramakrishna Rao Prathibha Puraskaaram
 Charles Phillip Brown Sahitya Puraskaaram
 Nori Narasimha Sastri Puraskaaram
 Kandukoori Rudrakavi Peetam Puraskaaram
 Paalkuri Somanatha Peetam Puraskaaram
 Palagummi Padmaraju Shata Jayanthi Puraskaaram
 TeNA Telangana Renaissance Awards, 2014, for Kaloji Narayana Rao Award (literature)

References

20th-century Indian poets
Telugu poets
Telugu writers
Telugu-language literature
Poets from Telangana
People from Mahbubnagar
Living people
1928 births
Osmania University alumni
Indian male poets
20th-century Indian male writers